The 2 seat Sylva Leader was derived from the Sylva Star kit car. Slightly less extreme styling led to better sales. Based on the ever popular Lotus 7 style of car there were many similar designs over the years.

Features
Engines ranged from the Ford crossflow 1300 to the 1600. Other options were the Ford Pinto, though this was rather tall for the bonnet line, and even a Rover V8 was fitted.

Suspension was originally from the Vauxhall Viva or Magnum and there was a Chevette based version as well.  Carburettors were usually twin 40 Webers or Dell'Ortos as the low bonnet made fitting the standard downdraft carb difficult.

The very strong steel spaceframe chassis was covered by a non stressed fiberglass body with the flip front bonnet giving excellent access to the engine bay.

Slightly larger and heavier than the later Striker it had a small boot accessible via the rear of the cockpit so if a full roll cage was fitted little could be carried. The front suspension was twin wishbones without an anti roll bar with a live rear axle with a 4-point location system. This worked surprisingly well due to the low centre of gravity.

The later Strikers had a 5-point location system which improved handling.

Production
Later production was taken over by Robbley Motors but this was short lived. Front engined rear wheel drive cars such as this are becoming rarer due to a shortage of suitable donor vehicles.

See also
 Sylva Autokits Ltd

References

Kit cars
Lotus Seven replicas